Ari Borovoy was Ari Borovoy's first solo album, released in 2005. Videos were made for two singles: "Booming" and "Si No Está." The album was digitally released in the United States in 2009.

Borovoy, a founding member of the Latin pop group OV7, made the disc during a seven-year period (2003–2010) in which the group had disbanded.

Track listing
"Éxtasis"
"Tú"
"Booming"
"Te Encontré"
"Me Vales"
"Si No Está"
"Se Fué"
"Frágiles"
"Llueve"
"Volvamos A Amar"
"Tiempo Atrás"

References

2005 debut albums
Sony Music albums